Jaghatu is a district in Maidan Wardak province, Afghanistan, 20 km northwest of Ghazni. According to 2019 data, the population is 50,792.
The district is within the heartland of the Wardak tribe of Pashtuns. Agriculture is the main source of income. The popular apples in Afghanistan is from this district. Drought has become a serious problem in the whole province. Health and education services are lacking although most of the people in this area have attempted to create schools and for students to attend with their own efforts.

History
Jaghatu district has some historical places such as Barghalee, which was the capital of the  empire before Islam. Sultan Dam is located in Jaghatu district although only two villages in the district benefit from the water,  the rest of the water goes towards the Khaja Omary district and Ghazni province.

Notable people
 

Abdul Hamid Bahij (born 1979), medical doctor, writer, translator and dictionary writer
Rahmatullah Nabil (born 1968), politician

Notes

Districts of Maidan Wardak Province